The Presbyterian Blue Hose football college football team represents Presbyterian College, currently an FCS independent. The Blue Hose currently compete as a member of the National Collegiate Athletic Association (NCAA) Division I Football Championship Subdivision. The program has had 15 different head coaches since it began play during the 1913 season.

Presbyterian has played 1,052 games over 104 seasons, appearing in 1 bowl game (1960 Tangerine Bowl). The team's 1,000th game was against Gardner–Webb, the last game of the 2013 season. They lost, 13–20.

Key

Coaches

Updated to the conclusion of the 2022 season.

Source

Notes

References

Presbyterian

Presbyterian Blue Hose